José de Jesús Oviedo Herrera (born 11 June 1965) is a Mexican politician affiliated with the PAN. He currently serves as Deputy of the LXII Legislature of the Mexican Congress representing Guanajuato.

References

1965 births
Living people
Politicians from Guanajuato
People from Guanajuato City
National Action Party (Mexico) politicians
21st-century Mexican politicians
Deputies of the LXII Legislature of Mexico
Members of the Chamber of Deputies (Mexico) for Guanajuato